Çıldır District is a district of Ardahan Province of Turkey. Its seat is the town Çıldır. Its area is 988 km2, and its population is 8,983 (2021).

The large Lake Çıldır in the district is an important haven for bird life.

Composition
There is one municipality in Çıldır District:
 Çıldır

There are 34 villages in Çıldır District:

 Ağıllı
 Akçakale
 Akçıl
 Akdarı
 Akkiraz
 Aşağıcambaz
 Baltalı
 Başköy
 Damlıca
 Dirsekkaya
 Doğankaya
 Eskibeyrehatun
 Eşmepınar
 Gölbelen
 Gölebakan
 Güvenocak
 Karakale
 Kaşlıkaya
 Kayabeyi
 Kenarbel
 Kenardere
 Kotanlı
 Kurtkale
 Kuzukaya
 Meryemköy
 Öncül
 Övündü
 Sabaholdu
 Saymalı
 Sazlısu
 Semihaşakir
 Taşdeğirmen
 Yenibeyrehatun
 Yukarıcambaz

References

Districts of Ardahan Province